The 2011–12 Amlin Challenge Cup pool stage was the opening stage of the 16th season of the European Challenge Cup, the second-tier competition for European rugby union clubs. It began on 10 November 2011 with two matches and ended on 22 January 2012.

Twenty teams participated in this phase of the competition; they were divided into five pools of four teams each, with each team playing the others home and away. Competition points were earned using the standard bonus point system. The pool winners advanced to the knockout stage, where they were joined by three entrants from the Heineken Cup pool stage. These teams then competed in a single-elimination tournament that ended with the final at the Twickenham Stoop in London on 18 May 2012.

Results
All times are local to the game location.

{| class="wikitable"
|+ Key to colours
|-
|bgcolor="#ccffcc"|    
|Winner of each pool advances to quarterfinals. Seed # in parentheses.
|}

Pool 1

Pool 2

Pool 3

Pool 4

Pool 5

See also
European Challenge Cup
2011–12 Heineken Cup

References

pool stage
2011-12